Carla Wieser (born 11 March 1961) is an Italian gymnast. She competed in six events at the 1976 Summer Olympics.

References

1961 births
Living people
Italian female artistic gymnasts
Olympic gymnasts of Italy
Gymnasts at the 1976 Summer Olympics
Place of birth missing (living people)